First Cabinet of Ivan Goremykin – composition of the Council of Ministers of the Russian Empire, under the leadership of Ivan Goremykin, worked from May 5, 1906 to July 21, 1906.

From the very beginning of its work, the Cabinet of Goremykin conflict with the State Duma, which tried to subjugate the government. For 72 days, the State Duma adopted a 391 request for the illegal actions of the government.

July 19, 1906, the State Duma was dissolved and on July 21 the government was dismissed.

Ministers

References

Goremykin
Cabinets established in 1906
1906 establishments in the Russian Empire